Hovhannes Kajaznuni or Katchaznouni (14 February 1868 – 15 January 1938) was an Armenian architect and politician who served as  the first Prime Minister of the First Republic of Armenia from 6 June 1918 to 7 August 1919. He was a member of the Armenian Revolutionary Federation.

Early life
Kajaznuni was born Hovhannes Ter-Hovhannisian in 1868 in the town of Akhaltsikh (present-day Akhaltsikhe), then part of the Akhaltsikhe uezd of the Tiflis Governorate of the Russian Empire, now part of Georgia. He attended secondary school in Tiflis from 1877 to 1886. In 1887, he moved to Saint Petersburg and entered the Citizens' Architectural Institute, graduating with honours in 1893. While in Saint Petersburg, Kajaznuni joined the Armenian Revolutionary Federation, eventually becoming one of its most important figures. After graduation, he worked at the construction department of the Baku provincial administration (1893–95), as an architect in Batum (1895–1897), and as regional architect at the Tiflis provincial administration (1897–99). Between 1899 and 1906, he worked as a senior architect in Baku, designing hospitals and apartment buildings, his most notable work being the Saint Thaddeus and Bartholomew Cathedral completed in 1911. After 1906 he devoted himself to political and social activities.

Political career
Kajaznuni was forced to leave the Caucasus in 1911 to avoid being called to testify at the trial of Armenian Revolutionary Federation members mounted by the Russian government in Saint Petersburg in January 1912. He lived in Constantinople and then in Van until 1914, when he returned to the Caucasus. He became a member of the Armenian National Council in 1917 and was an ARF representative in the Seym (the Transcaucasian Parliament) until 1918.

Trebizond Peace Conference and Transcaucasian Federation
He was part of the Armenian delegation that conducted peace talks with the Ottoman Empire at the Trebizond Peace Conference, beginning on 14 March 1918. The three groups of Transcaucasian delegates—Muslim, Georgian and Armenian—had divergent aims, and were in a weak position to negotiate with the Ottomans. While the talks progressed, the Ottoman Third Army retook Erzurum after the Imperial Russian army abandoned it and advanced to the previous frontier with Russia. These setbacks spurred Akaki Chkhenkeli, the Georgian Menshevik leader of the Transcaucasian delegation, to unilaterally inform the Ottomans that he would accept the Treaty of Brest-Litovsk as the basis for negotiation, and thereby abandon Armenian claims to portions of Ottoman territory. This concession was repudiated by the Seym, which ordered Chkhenkeli and the delegation to return to Tiflis.

The capture of Batum by Ottoman troops on 14 April 1918 sapped the will of the Georgian Mensheviks to continue fighting the Ottomans, and they pushed their Transcaucasian allies to accept the two Ottoman prerequisites for resuming negotiations: a recognition of Turkey's territorial rights and a full break with Russia. This resulted in the Mensheviks and Muslims in the Seym proposing on 22 April 1918 to establish a Transcaucasian Democratic Federative Republic with reluctant endorsement from the increasingly isolated Armenian representatives. The new republic's cabinet was selected by Chkhenkeli as premier-designate, and included Kajaznuni as one of four Armenians. One of Chkhenkeli's first acts, without consulting the Seym or the Armenian cabinet members, was to order the Armenian army to surrender Kars to the Ottomans. The furious Armenian leaders tendered their resignations from the cabinet and demanded Chkhenkeli be replaced. The Mensheviks would only agree to replace him with Kajaznuni or another Armenian. The Armenians realized that nominating an Armenian premier would cause the Ottomans to attack Russian Armenia, which was on the front-line since the loss of Kars. Accordingly, Kajaznuni and his fellow Dashnaks allowed the Seym to confirm their cabinet positions on 26 April 1918.

Batum Peace Conference
Kajaznuni also accompanied Chkhenkeli as a delegate to the Batum Peace Conference that began on 11 May 1918. The conference saw the Ottomans extend their demands to include Akhaltsikh and Akhalkalaki in Tiflis Governorate and the western half of Erivan Governorate. Before the Transcaucasus delegation had delivered a response, Ottoman forces invaded the Erivan Governorate, and on May 15 captured Alexandropol. A week later, they had approached both Erivan and Karakilisa. Unable to negotiate anything more favorable than capitulation with the Ottomans, the Georgian leaders at the Batum talks arranged a side-deal with Germany to exchange German protection for access to Georgia's economic resources. The result was that the Seym dissolved the federative republic on 26 May 1918, with the Democratic Republic of Georgia declared the same day and the republics of Azerbaijan and Armenia declared on May 28.

Independent Armenia
The Armenian National Council elected Kajaznuni as the first prime minister of the independent Armenian state on 6 June 1918 and his cabinet was formed on June 30. Kajaznuni held this position until 7 August 1919; with the nomination as a prime minister abroad from 5 June 1919. He was in diplomatic missions in Europe (beginning in August 1919) and the United States (from 9 October 1919 until August 1920). During the battle for Zangibasar (modern-day Masis) on 19–21 June 1920, Kajaznuni's son Aram (a lieutenant in the Armenian army) was killed by Tatar rebels—this was the second son he had lost in battle since 1918. Kajaznuni later returned to Armenia to become chairman of the parliament on 4 November 1920. Kajaznuni was arrested after the Bolsheviks came to power in December 1920 but was freed during the February 1921 revolt against the Soviet regime.

Soviet Period
After the end of the revolt in early April 1921, he left the country and lived in Bucharest from 1921 to 1924. In 1925 he returned to Soviet Armenia and worked as an architect in Leninakan. He also taught at the technical department of Yerevan State University, lecturing on construction and architecture. In 1930 he joined the newly established Construction Institute and attained the title of professor there. Kajaznuni became a member of the Armenian Union of Architects. Kajaznuni was a victim of Stalin's Great Terror—arrested in 1937 and imprisoned, he died in prison in 1938. The exact date of his death is unknown.

Report to the 1923 ARF Congress
Kajaznuni prepared a critical report for the Armenian Revolutionary Federation party convention held in Bucharest during April 1923 (the 10th Congress of the Party was held in 1924-1925) titled Dashnaktsutyun Has Nothing More to Do, which called for the party's support of Soviet Armenia. Before this event, every single Armenian political party in exile was opposed to Soviet Armenia's stance.

Kajaznuni published his report in Vienna in 1923. In the same year it was republished by non-A.R.F. circles in Tbilisi, Alexandria (Egypt), and Bucharest. Its claims immediately drew rebuke from the party.

In 1927, Zakkniga in Tiflis published a Russian translation of Kajaznuni's report in an edition of 2,000 copies, with an introduction by S. Khanoyan.

A condensed version of the report was translated into English in 1955 by Matthew Aram Callender, and edited by Arthur Derounian. In the introduction written by Derounian (whose birth name was Avedis Boghos Derounian), an anti-Dashnak journalist, Kajaznuni is described as a "patriot" whose report was a "deep and incisive self-study" that is a "refutation" of the "grandiose, exaggerated and even outrageously false claims of the Dashnag leadership today".

The Armenian original was reprinted twice in Yerevan in 1994 and 1995.

In 2007 Turkish historian Mehmet Perinçek produced new texts in Turkish and English claimed to be translations of Kajaznuni's 1923 report, based on a Russian copy (printed in Tbilisi in 1927) held in the Russian State Library in Moscow. Perinçek said that the Russian State Library copy was unabridged and that translations for these copies were unavailable before. Callender's translation did abridge the main body of the book but translated Kajaznuni's introduction verbatim - this is the key section which contains the description of the Armenian genocide. A note on page 4 explains that Callender has translated most of Kajaznuni's remarks directly: "Except for abridgements, made for the sake of brevity by the translator and the editor, Katchaznouni's utterances appear verbatim." On page 8, after the description of the genocide, Callender indicates that he is switching from verbatim to selective translation: "Translator's Note: Up to this point the words of the author have been translated verbatim in order to give an idea of Mr. Katchaznouni's logical mind and the exposition of the facts that drove him to present his 'Manifesto' to his colleagues at the 1923 Convention. From here on, and solely for the sake of brevity, we shall quote excerpts of his arguments which led to his decision as to why the Dashnagtzoutiun, in his opinion, should 'decisively end its existence' because 'there is no work for the Party.'.

Armenian scholar Viken L. Attarian claims Perinçek's "discovery" is actually a forgery made by partisan Turkish historians to deny the fact of the Armenian genocide. As evidence for his position, Attarian notes that these alleged translations into Turkish, English and German were published by Kaynak Yayınları in Istanbul as the first in a book series titled Ermeni Belgeleriyle Ermeni Soykırımı Yalanı (in English: The Lie of the 'Armenian Genocide' in Armenian Documents).

Attarian said: "The Turkish denialists are the ones who talk most about Katchaznouni and ... use texts and falsified translations that have nothing in common with the originals... Whatever the Turk denialists present about K is wrong and a lie... Katchaznouni never denied the Genocide and ... never betrayed his homeland". In Matthew A. Callender's translation, made from the original Armenian text, Kajaznuni describes what happened to the Armenians as a "holocaust" (p. 7):

Bibliography

 (Book cover), Full text online
 Ovanes Kachaznuni. The Hundred and Ten Days in Europe. Baku, 1911 (new edition in Russian, Saint Petersburg, 2013)

See also
First Republic of Armenia
John Roy Carlson

Notes

References

Sources
 
 
 
 
 
 
 
 
 
 
 
  (also London and Sydney: Croom Helm)
 
 
 

1868 births
1938 deaths
People from Akhaltsikhe
People of the First Republic of Armenia
Prime Ministers of Armenia
Foreign ministers of Armenia
Armenian Revolutionary Federation politicians
Great Purge victims from Armenia
Armenian people executed by the Soviet Union
Armenian people murdered abroad
Armenian people from the Russian Empire
Armenian anti-communists
Saint-Petersburg State University of Architecture and Civil Engineering alumni